The Superior Labor Court or Tribunal Superior do Trabalho (TST), in Portuguese, is the highest Brazilian appellate court for labor law issues. Its headquarters are located in Brasilia, near the American Embassy.

It is one of the five high courts in Brazil.

It is the highest instance in the Brazilian federalized labor courts system, which includes the Regional Labor Courts (Tribunais Regionais do Trabalho - TRT's), at common appeal level, and the Trial Labor Courts (Varas do Trabalho) in the first instance level.

History
The origin of the court was the National Labor Council, created in 1923, which was a part of the Federal Executive Branch, subordinated to the Ministry of Agriculture, Industry and Commerce.

In 1946 the Council was transformed into the Tribunal Superior do Trabalho. The Brazilian Constitution adopted in that same year recognized the TST as part of the Judiciary Branch, no longer subordinated to the Executive Branch. That basic situation was kept by all subsequent Constitutions.

Since its origins, that Court was integrated by both effective Ministers and temporary class Ministers. The effective Ministers (nicknamed "togados" after the distinctive robes - "togas" - which they wear) were considered Magistrates for all legal prerogatives, while the Temporary Classist Ministers ("classistas"), which were paritary representatives of both employers and employees ("classes"), were appointed for a fixed term (usually three years) and had fewer powers and prerogatives. The Classist Ministers were abolished by a constitutional amendment in 1999, subsisting only the effective Ministers.

Composition
By the actual legislation, the Court is integrated by 27 members, entitled Ministers (Ministros), pointed by the President of Brazil. The nomination only occurs after the approval of the Senate. All the nominated members must be at least 35 and no more than 65 years old, must have Brazilian nationality and moral integrity, plus all the requirements to enter in a public service career (e.g. having fulfilled military conscription and electoral duties).

There are three positions reserved for lawyers, indicated by the Order of Attorneys of Brazil (the official Bar association), three for members of the Public Ministry, and the remaining 21 for career judges of the Regional Labor Courts.

See also
 Brazil federal courts

References

External links
 Official website (Portuguese)

Brazilian labour law
Judiciary of Brazil
Labour courts
1946 establishments in Brazil
Courts and tribunals established in 1946